Estany de la Balmeta is a lake in Pyrénées-Orientales, France.

Balmeta